Sinocyclocheilus liboensis is a species of cyprinid fish in the genus Sinocyclocheilus.

References 

liboensis
Fish described in 2004